The Japanese Super Formula Championship is a formula racing series. It is considered as being the top level of single-seater racing in Japan and regional motorsports in Asia. The series is sanctioned by the Japan Automobile Federation (JAF) and managed by Japan Race Promotion (JRP). As of 2022, Super Formula is the fastest racing series in the world after Formula One.

The first Japanese Top Formula championship was held in 1973 as the All-Japan Formula 2000 Championship. In 1978, the series transformed into the All-Japan Formula Two Championship, and again in 1987, into the All-Japan Formula 3000 Championship. For the most part, these Japanese racing series closely followed their European counterparts in terms of technical regulations. The JRP was established in 1995, and began managing the series in 1996, under its new name, the Formula Nippon Championship. The series' name was changed again in 2013, to Super Formula (officially Japanese Championship Super Formula until 2016).

History

Background 
In Japan, touring and sports car racing was very popular throughout the 1960s. The Japanese Grand Prix was originally held as an event for touring and sports cars, and was immediately established as the largest motor racing event in the country during its original run between 1963 to 1969. On the other hand, formula car racing had a more difficult time being established in the nation's motorsport landscape. The inaugural JAF Grand Prix at Fuji Speedway in 1969 was Japan's first major single-seater race. And in 1971, the Japanese Grand Prix was reformatted into an event centered around formula car racing. Neither event managed to be as popular with spectators as the Japanese Grand Prix was during its time as a sports car race.

All-Japan Formula 2000 (1973–1977)

In 1973, the Japan Automobile Federation established the All-Japan Formula 2000 Championship as the first top-level formula racing series in Japan, to promote the sport of formula car racing in the country.

The series was based on the European Formula Two Championship. But unlike European F2, which only allowed the use of racing engines based on mass production models, the JAF approved the use of purpose-built racing engines from manufacturers such as Mitsubishi Motors.

All-Japan Formula Two (1978–1986)

In 1976, the FIA modified the Formula Two regulations to allow the use of purpose-built racing engines. With this change, the reasoning behind the name "Formula 2000" had disappeared, which led to the series being renamed the All-Japan Formula Two Championship from 1978.

These early years of formula racing in Japan were led by drivers such as Kunimitsu Takahashi, Kazuyoshi Hoshino, Masahiro Hasemi, Keiji Matsumoto, and Satoru Nakajima, who would go on to become the first Japanese driver to compete full-time in the Formula One World Championship. During the transition from Formula 2000 to Formula 2, a number of foreign drivers from the European F2 circuit began competing in and winning races in the Japanese series. 1981 European F2 champion Geoff Lees became the series' first non-Japanese champion when he won the All-Japan F2 title in 1983.

The Suzuka Formula Two Championship (established in 1977 as the Suzuka Formula 2000 Championship) was held concurrently at all events staged at Suzuka Circuit, to compete against the Fuji Grand Champion Series. During its run from 1977 to 1986, it was considered to be of equal prestige to the All-Japan Formula 2 Championship.

1987 championship
When European Formula Two ended in 1984, its Japanese counterpart did not follow suit immediately. The JAF considered starting a new Formula Two series from 1988. However, all entrants ran Formula 3000 cars in 1987. So, the 1987 Formula Two Championship was cancelled due to no entry of any cars for that format.

All-Japan Formula 3000 (1987–1995)
Switching to the open Formula 3000 standard in 1987, the All-Japan Formula 3000 Championship officially started in 1988.

During the late 1980s, a number of factors contributed to a surge in popularity for Japanese Top Formula racing. Honda-powered Formula One teams began winning multiple championships. The Japanese Grand Prix was reintroduced to the Formula One calendar in 1987, and that same year, Satoru Nakajima began competing full-time in F1. Fans began following the series through Fuji Television's broadcasts of Formula One, resulting in an increased interest in all forms formula racing. Combined with the asset-driven bubble economy of the 1980s, the All-Japan Formula 3000 Championship attracted several entrants and investors.

Veteran drivers such as Hoshino, Hasemi, Takahashi, and Matsumoto were succeeded by a new generation of Japanese talents, led by 1988 champion Aguri Suzuki, and 1991 champion Ukyo Katayama - who would each go on to enjoy significant tenures in Formula One. The prosperous conditions within All-Japan F3000 also attracted many promising young drivers outside of Japan to compete in the series. Among those drivers included future Formula One Grand Prix winners Jean Alesi, Johnny Herbert, Eddie Irvine, and Heinz-Harald Frentzen. The most notable of these young drivers from outside Japan, however, was future seven-time Formula One World Champion Michael Schumacher, who made a one-off appearance at Sportsland Sugo in 1991.

The eventual burst of the bubble economy led to a decline in the series' popularity during the early to mid 1990s. Japanese and European regulations paralleled one another until 1996, when the International Formula 3000 series became a one-make format to lower costs.

Formula Nippon (1996–2012)

In 1995, Japan Race Promotion (JRP) was established by Fuji Television, and became the new promoter and organising body of Japanese top formula racing, recognised by the JAF. As F3000 went down the path of a spec formula series abroad, the JRP opted to continue with the previous F3000 regulations which allowed for open chassis and engine competition. For 1996, the first full season under the management of JRP, the series changed its name to Formula Nippon.

Many of the top drivers in Formula Nippon continued to race in sports cars and touring cars as their predecessors had done in years past. Pedro de la Rosa became the first "double champion" of Japan in 1997 when he won both the Formula Nippon and All-Japan GT Championship GT500 titles in the same calendar year. Satoshi Motoyama and Richard Lyons would later accomplish the same feat in 2003 and 2004, respectively.

Super Formula (2013-present) 
On 5 August, 2012, the JRP announced that the series would change its name from Formula Nippon to Super Formula in 2013, stating a "desire to establish the series on an equal footing with the FIA Formula One World Championship and the IZOD IndyCar Series as the undisputed, standard-bearer top formula racing in Asia."

The series experienced a surge of international interest when 2015 GP2 Series champion, Stoffel Vandoorne, entered full-time in 2016 with DoCoMo Team Dandelion Racing. Vandoorne would finish his season with two race victories before making the step up to F1 with McLaren in 2017. A year later, 2016 GP2 Series champion Pierre Gasly entered the series, bringing Red Bull sponsorship with him to Team Mugen. Gasly finished 2017 as the Rookie of the Year, with two wins, and finished runner-up in the standings by half a point.

Felix Rosenqvist, Álex Palou, and Patricio O'Ward later became IndyCar Series race winners after racing in Super Formula. Palou, who was the 2019 Rookie of the Year, went on to win the IndyCar Series championship in 2021.

Scoring system 
In 2020, Super Formula adopted a new top ten scoring system similar to the one used in Super GT. Bonus points were given to the top three qualifiers in every round; three points for pole position, two for second place, and one for third place.

 Race points (2020-present)

 Qualifying points (2020-present)

Car specifications

Cars

Until 2002, Formula Nippon was an open formula category, where a variety of chassis builders, engine manufacturers, and tyre manufacturers could compete. Chassis were supplied by Lola, Reynard, and G-Force. Mugen-Honda supplied the vast majority of the engines along with Cosworth and Judd. Bridgestone, Yokohama, and Dunlop supplied teams with tyres. However, the series began adopting more spec components. Bridgestone became the series' sole tyre supplier beginning in 1997, and in 1998, Mugen-Honda became the sole engine supplier (though open tuning was still allowed). Chassis remained an open formula until 2003, after Reynard declared bankruptcy and G-Force withdrew from the series. The Lola B03/51 became the series' spec chassis thereafter.

In 2006 Formula Nippon underwent a drastic revision of its technical regulations. The new Lola FN06 chassis was introduced, while new three-litre V8 engines by Toyota and Honda were introduced, based on the same engine blocks that the manufacturers used in the 2005 IndyCar Series. American racecar manufacturer Swift Engineering produced the FN09 chassis that was introduced in 2009, and used until 2013. Also, in 2009, a new 3.4 litre V8 engine formula was introduced, a common engine that would be used in Formula Nippon and the GT500 class of Super GT, as well as a "push-to-pass" overtake system that is still used today.

The current spec chassis for the series is the Dallara SF19, which was unveiled at Suzuka Circuit in October 2017. The SF19 weighs 670 kilogrammes (including the driver), and is powered by two-litre single turbo-charged engines built by Honda and Toyota under the Nippon Race Engine (NRE) formula. The engines used in Super Formula have been detuned compared to their counterparts used in Super GT (GT500), but continue to allow for the use of the "push-to-pass" style Overtaking System (OTS) that allows for an additional five kilogrammes per hour (5 kg/h) of fuel burn for up to 200 seconds during a race.

The previous generation of the car, the Dallara SF14, was used between the 2014 to 2018 season, and featured at least 30% components manufactured in Japan. The pole position lap time for a Super-Formula Dallara SF14 at Suzuka Circuit in 2017, 1:35.907, was 8.588 seconds, or 9.0%, slower than the pole lap time for the 2017 Japanese Grand Prix.

In 2016, Yokohama Rubber replaced Bridgestone as the series' sole tyre supplier.

Specifications (2014–2018)
 Engine displacement:  DOHC inline-4
 Gearbox: 6-speed paddle shift gearbox
 Weight: 
 Power output: 
 Fuel: 102 RON unleaded gasoline
 Fuel delivery: Direct fuel injection
 Aspiration: Single-turbocharged
 Length: 
 Width: 
 Wheelbase: 
 Steering: Electric power-assisted rack and pinion
Tyres:Yokohama ADVAN radial dry slicks and treaded rain tyres

Specifications (2019–present)
 Engine displacement:  DOHC inline-4
 Gearbox: 6-speed paddle shift gearbox
 Weight: 
 Power output: 
 Fuel: 102 RON unleaded gasoline
 Fuel delivery: Direct fuel injection
 Aspiration: Single-turbocharged
 Length: 
 Width: 
 Wheelbase: 
 Steering: Electric power-assisted rack and pinion
Tyres: Yokohama ADVAN radial dry slicks and treaded rain tyres

Drivers
In terms of drivers, Super Formula is a high-level series where the drivers are professional. It is unanimously regarded as the highest level of formula racing in Japan and Asia, while compared to other series globally, it is generally regarded to be a higher level series than Formula 2, but not quite on the level of IndyCar and to a larger extent Formula One. Super Formula is not a feeder or junior series as there is no series directly above and many professional drivers compete in it until they retire, although some drivers, mostly foreign, have used it as a platform to prove their ability in an attempt to move to Formula One or elsewhere.

The bulk of the grid consists of Japanese drivers, most of whom have the goal of forging successful long-term careers in the series. Foreign drivers have always been regular participants in the series, and there have been several drivers to come from a Japanese Top Formula drive to a prominent Formula One role; the best-known of these include Eddie Irvine, Ralf Schumacher, Pedro de la Rosa, and Pierre Gasly. Conversely, several foreign drivers have built long careers in Japan; examples of such drivers include André Lotterer, Benoît Tréluyer, Loïc Duval, and João Paulo de Oliveira. Most drivers in the series are contracted to either Honda or Toyota – the series' two engine manufacturers since 2006 – for whom they also typically compete in the Super GT sports car series, Japan's other top motorsport category.

Feeder series
The primary feeder series for Super Formula is Super Formula Lights, which was known as the Japanese Formula 3 Championship prior to 2020. Starting in 2022, Honda Performance Development, the United States division of Honda's motorsport operations, have offered a $600,000 USD annual scholarship to the winner of the Formula Regional Americas Championship towards a Honda-powered seat in Super Formula. 2021 champion Kyffin Simpson, the first recipient, declined the scholarship offer, citing the logistical challenges brought on by the COVID-19 pandemic. Raoul Hyman accepted the offer after becoming series champion in 2022.

Champions

* The indicates the tyre (since 1997), chassis (since 2003), or engine (1998–2005) was a spec part that all competitors used for that season.

Statistics

Championships

by driver 
 Indicates active driver.

by team

Wins 
as of the end of the 2022 season.

by driver

by chassis constructor

by engine manufacturer

Poles

Circuits 
Super Formula races are traditionally held at the six major national racing circuits in Japan. Since the establishment of the JRP in 1996, Suzuka Circuit, the traditional home of the Formula One Japanese Grand Prix, has staged more rounds than any other venue. Suzuka typically hosts two rounds per season: The Suzuka 2&4 Race, a joint event staged with the All-Japan Road Race Championship, is typically held in the spring. The JAF Grand Prix Suzuka, Japan's oldest national formula racing event, is typically held at the end of the season in the autumn. 

Sportsland SUGO is the only other venue that has been on the calendar in every season since 1996. Fuji Speedway did not host any racing in 2004 while the circuit underwent a wholesale renovation, but otherwise, has been part of the calendar in every season before and after the renovations. Mobility Resort Motegi (formerly Twin Ring Motegi) opened in 1997 and has been part of the calendar every year since.

Miné Circuit (formerly Nishinihon Circuit), was a regular fixture of the calendar until it closed for spectator events after the 2005 season. Autopolis, in Kyushu, and Okayama International Circuit, in the Chugoku region, have since taken Miné's place as the westernmost venues that Super Formula visits.

Sepang International Circuit in Malaysia hosted the first and only championship round outside of Japan when it was part of the 2004 calendar. The series planned to race at Inje Speedium in South Korea during the 2013 season, but the race was cancelled.

Circuits used (since 1996) 
 Bold denotes a circuit used in the 2022 Super Formula season.
 Italic denotes a formerly used circuit.

References

External links

 Super Formula official website 

Formula racing series
Formula racing
 
Recurring sporting events established in 1973